Michael James Bryant (Mike Bryant) (born 1 May 1960, High Wycombe, Buckinghamshire, England) is an English electronic musician and one of the co-founders of the electronic music group Fluke along with Jon Fugler and Mike Tournier. He first met with other members of Fluke in High Wycombe.

Life and career
Bryant joined Fluke in 1988 at the age of 28 in Beaconsfield, Buckinghamshire.

Notes and references

1960 births
Living people
English electronic musicians
English keyboardists
Fluke (band) members
People from High Wycombe